East Rochester Junior-Senior High School (ERHS) is a public high school serving 596 students in the seventh through twelfth grade in East Rochester in the U.S. state of New York and is part of the East Rochester Union Free School District. 
The student–teacher ratio is 12 to 1. The principal is Casey Van Harssel.

School information
On February 3, 2007, a hydrogen fuel cell was installed at the high school, providing self-generated electricity to the school.

Extracurricular activities

Clubs and organizations

Sports
ERHS is known as "The Home of Champions", with a history producing state-wide and national champions in several sports, including golf, baseball, bowling, wrestling, and cheerleading. The school has several new or renovated facilities and has recently switched to the Wayne County League, where it competes against schools its own size.

The ERHS Bombers have won Section V team titles in several sports, including:
 1985–86: Girls Field Hockey
 1987–88: Girls Field Hockey
 1988–89: Girls Field Hockey
 1989–90: Girls Field Hockey
 1990–91: Girls Field Hockey
 1994–95: Girls Field Hockey
 2001–02: Girls Field Hockey
 2002–03: Girls Field Hockey
 2003–04: Girls Field Hockey
 2004–05: Girls Field Hockey
 2005–06: Girls Field Hockey
 2006–07: Girls Field Hockey
 2007–08: Girls Field Hockey
 2008–09: Girls Field Hockey
 2009–10: Girls Field Hockey
 1993–94: Cheerleading
 1994–95: Cheerleading
 1998–99: Cheerleading
 2000–01: Cheerleading x2
 2001–02: Cheerleading
 2003–04: Cheerleading x2
 2004–05: Cheerleading x2
 2005–06: Cheerleading x2
 2006–07: Cheerleading
 2007–08: Cheerleading
 2008–09: Cheerleading
 2009–10: Cheerleading
 2010–11: Cheerleading
 2011–12: Cheerleading
 2014–15: Cheerleading
 2015–16: Cheerleading
 1979–80: Boys Cross Country 
 1985–86: Boys Cross Country
 1986–87: Boys Cross Country
 1987–89: Boys Cross Country
 1989–90: Boys Cross Country
 1990–91: Boys Cross Country
 1992–93: Boys Cross Country
 1993–94: Boys Cross Country
 1994–95: Boys Cross Country
 1995–96: Boys Cross Country
 1999–2000: Boys Cross Country
 2001–02: Boys Cross Country
 2002–03: Boys Cross Country
 1996–97: Girls Cross Country
 1997–98: Girls cross country (Class CC)
 1999–2000: Girls Cross country (Class CC)
 2000–01: Girls Cross Country
 2001–02: Girls Cross Country
 1994–95: Baseball (Class A), Boys cross country (Class CC), Field hockey
 1993–94: Baseball (Class B), Boys cross country (Class CC), Wrestling (Class C)
 1992–93: Baseball (Class B), Boys cross country (Class CC), Wrestling (Class C)

The Bombers have also won state titles including the following teams:
 1987–88: Girls Field Hockey
 2004–05: Girls Field Hockey
 2005–06: Girls Field Hockey
 2008–09: Girls Field Hockey
 2001–02: Boys Cross Country

Performance
In 2004, 2005 and 2006, more than 75 percent of graduates received a Regents diploma, which exceeds the state average. Student weighted overall test scores compared to other schools in New York is 76 (0–100 scale).

Honors
"For exceptional work in 2002–03," English teacher Mary Eilers-Knapp received a certificate for excellence in teaching from the Margaret Warner Graduate School of Education and Human Development at the University of Rochester.

References

External links

East Rochester Union Free School District Website
Greatschools.net profile
City-Data.com profile
schoolmatters.com profile

Public high schools in New York (state)
Public middle schools in New York (state)
High schools in Monroe County, New York